St Mirren are competing in their fifth successive season in the Scottish Premier League after finishing in tenth place for season 2009–10. The most notable change at the club during the close season was the replacement of both manager Gus MacPherson and assistant manager Andy Millen after 7 seasons of managing the club.  This was the longest period any manager had spent in charge of the club since the 1950s and at the time of MacPherson's sacking he was the longest serving manager of a Scottish League Club.  They were replaced by the former Cowdenbeath management partnership of Danny Lennon and Iain Jenkins.

St Mirren started the SPL campaign with a home fixture against the 2010 Scottish Cup holders, Dundee United at St Mirren Park on 14 August 2010.

Transfers

Manager Danny Lennon has been active in signing new players during the close season after 9 players left the club over the summer. Lennon recruited many players from Scotland's Division 1 and 2 including the acquisition of 4 players from his former club, Cowdenbeath. 2 former players, David Van Zanten and Marc McAusland also rejoined St Mirren.

The most notable departures from the club were that of first team regulars, Andy Dorman, Billy Mehmet and vice-captain Jack Ross after their contracts expired.

Influential Welsh international midfielder Andy Dorman has moved to English Championship side Crystal Palace, managed by the former Scotland boss George Burley. Dorman had spent two and a half years in Paisley, during which time he won his first international cap against Croatia and was joint top goalscorer in his first full season at the club.

Billy Mehmet moved to Gençlerbirliği S.K. in the Turkish Süper Lig. Mehmet was St Mirren's top scorer in all competitions during the 2009–10 season with 12 goals, most having been scored in cup competitions, including the winning goal versus Heart of Midlothian in the League Cup semi-final.

Jack Ross left the club having spent the latter part of the season out with an ankle injury and joined SPL rivals Hamilton Academical.

In

Out

Source

Loan In

Loan Out

Results

Scottish Premier League

Scottish Cup

Scottish League Cup

Friendlies

Competitions

Overall

SPL

Classification

Results by round

See also
List of St Mirren F.C. seasons

References

2010-11
Scottish football clubs 2010–11 season